"I'm Outta Love" is the debut single of American singer Anastacia. Written by Anastacia, Sam Watters, and Louis Biancaniello and produced by the latter two, it was released on February 29, 2000, as the lead single from her debut album, Not That Kind (2000). The song became a major hit in Europe and Australia, reaching number one in Wallonia, Australia and New Zealand; it was the most successful song of 2000 in the latter two regions. It additionally reached the top five in several others, including France, Ireland, Italy, the Netherlands, and Switzerland.

Background and recording
Following a short-living dancing career on television shows such as MTV's Club MTV and work as a backup dancer in music videos, including rap group Salt-N-Pepa's clip for "Get Up Everybody (Get Up)", in 1993, Anastacia relocated from New York to Los Angeles in hopes of launching a singing career. Soon after, she signed a production deal with Cece Peniston manager O.G. Pearce, but failed to arrange a recording contract. In 1997, Anastacia met San Diego-based music executive Lisa Braudé, who signed her with Braudé Management and encouraged her to join MTV's The Cut, a talent series for unsigned acts, the following year. Her appearance on the show led to a meeting with Epic Records A&R executive David Massey who offered a recording contract with his own label Daylight, a custom label of Sony Music Entertainment's Epic company, in March 1999.

For the sound of her debut album Not That Kind, Anastacia envisioned "something in a funky, Sly and the Family Stone" style. While Massey felt that it would be hard to find a song that stood up to her massive voice, he consulted Sam Watters from Epic's R&B group Color Me Badd to work on "a great song for a big voice, kind of "I Will Survive" but with a little more substance." Within three or four days, Watters presented a demo of "I'm Outta Love" in its earliest form. After listening to the demo, Anastacia agreed to further work on it alongside Watters and co-producer Louis Biancaniello. In an interview discussing the development of the song, Anastacia revealed that they had adopted Massey's approach while writing it, aiming for a song "like "It's Raining Men" and "I Will Survive", one that makes you move and makes you happy." Answering a question on British music show Later... with Jools Holland regarding if this song was about anybody in particular, Anastacia later replied, "It's about a lot of people in particular, not just one but probably many in my life who I wanted to have a love thing with but it wasn't there."

Composition
Written in the key of B♭ Dorian mode with a tempo of 119 beats per minute, "I'm Outta Love"'s instrumentation features a synth bass, guitar and keyboards. Its main chord sequence of B♭m–F–A♭–E♭ starts 19 seconds into the song, after an introduction of different rhythmic keyboard and synth sounds, which is omitted in the radio edit. This chord progression forms most of the song except the final line of the verses and chorus, in which it changes to B♭m–F–G♭–F. Throughout the song, Anastacia uses a gospel-like voice and uses various ad-libs in the second and third choruses. The song ends on a fade-out.

Critical reception
"I'm Outta Love" has been lauded by contemporary music critics. William Ruhlmann of AllMusic called the song an "aggressive dancefloor item," and added: "The minute she opens her mouth she starts reminding you of other singers, especially Aretha Franklin." Michel Paoletta, editor for Billboard magazine, declared "I'm Outta Love" a "sonic joyride [...] which moves and grooves with a spirit all its own." Less impressed, MTVAsia.com editor Tricia Boey wrote that this song "could very well have been sung by Jennifer Lopez or a whole Billboard chart-full of other divas."

Chart performance

"I'm Outta Love" was first released in the United States, where a promo-only 12-inch single was issued to club DJs in November 1999. Officially released to radio and retailers on February 29, 2000, the song debuted on the US Billboard Hot 100 on the week of April 1, 2000. It spent three weeks on the chart, peaking at number ninety-two. As of 2016, the single remains Anastacia's only entry on the chart. "I'm Outta Love" fared better on several of the Billboard component charts, reaching number eleven on the Hot Dance Music/Maxi-Singles Sales chart and number two for eight consecutive weeks on the Hot Dance Club Play chart. "I'm Outta Love" also reached number eleven on the Canadian Singles Chart.

The single was released to greater international success in Australia and Europe, where Daylight Records and the Epic label had planned to develop a platform first and promotion through affiliates took off much quicker than in North America. In Australia, the track debuted at number six on the Australian Singles Chart, a month later reached number one and stayed there for five consecutive weeks. The song eventually became the highest-selling single of the year, and was certified double platinum by the Australian Recording Industry Association (ARIA) for selling over 140,000 copies. In New Zealand, the single spent seven consecutive weeks at the top of the charts, and after shipping over 15,000 units to retailers, the Recording Industry Association of New Zealand (RIANZ) certified it platinum. Like in Australia, the song ended up the highest-selling single of the year in New Zealand.

The track reached the top ten in most European countries in which it charted. "I'm Outta Love" spent three consecutive weeks at number-one in the Wallonia region of Belgium and was ranked eighth on national year-end chart. It also reached the top five in Austria, France, Hungary, Ireland, Italy, the Netherlands, Norway, Scotland, and Switzerland, and it entered the top ten in Denmark, Germany, Spain, and the Flanders region of Belgium. In the United Kingdom, "I'm Outta Love" peaked at number six and was certified silver by the British Phonographic Industry (BPI) on October 1, 2000.

Music video

The music video for "I'm Outta Love", directed by Nigel Dick and choreographed by Robin Antin, was filmed on location at the Park Plaza Hotel in Los Angeles, California. Dick had previously shot the video for Guns N' Roses's "Welcome to the Jungle" (1987) at the same location. In 1999, "I'm Outta Love" earned Anastacia her first MTV Europe Music Award nomination in the Best New Act category at the 2000 awards ceremony. The song also spawned an official remix video for the Hex Hector Radio Mix, which included some new and extended scenes.

Synopsis
The video starts out with Anastacia walking through a tunnel with her coat on and cuts to a dressing room where she and her singers are preparing for a performance on stage. Intercut scenes of her female singers are shown in-between alongside Anastacia singing in the crowd. During the performance, a man who admires Anastacia neglects his girlfriend in favor of the performance. After the girlfriend confronts him and leaves, the man writes his phone number on a letter for Anastacia. After the performance, the man finds Anastacia backstage talking with her friends and gives her the letter with his number. She quickly reads it and walks away from the man, disgusted by his actions.

Track listings

 US CD single
 "I'm Outta Love" (album version) – 4:02
 "I'm Outta Love" (Hex Hector radio mix) – 3:50
 "Baptize My Soul" – 4:13

 US maxi-CD single
 "I'm Outta Love" (radio edit) – 3:57
 "I'm Outta Love" (Hex Hector radio edit) – 3:51
 "I'm Outta Love" (Matty's Soulflower Mix) – 5:56
 "I'm Outta Love" (Hex Hector main club mix) – 7:59
 "I'm Outta Love" (Ron Trent's club mix) – 8:35
 "Baptize My Soul" – 4:13

 US 7-inch and cassette single
A. "I'm Outta Love" (album version) – 4:02
B. "Baptize My Soul" – 4:13

 UK CD single
 "I'm Outta Love" (radio edit) – 3:57
 "I'm Outta Love" (Rhythm Masters vocal mix) – 6:47
 "I'm Outta Love" (Ron Trent's club mix) – 8:33
 "I'm Outta Love" (multimedia video version)

 UK cassette single
 "I'm Outta Love" (radio edit) – 3:57
 "I'm Outta Love" (Rhythm Masters radio mix) – 3:53

 European CD1
 "I'm Outta Love" (album version) – 4:02
 "I'm Outta Love" (Matty's Too Deep Mix) – 9:28

 European CD2
 "I'm Outta Love" (album version) – 4:02
 "I'm Outta Love" (Matty's Too Deep Mix) – 9:28
 "I'm Outta Love" (Hex Hector Main club mix) – 7:59
 "I'm Outta Love" (Hex Hector radio mix) – 4:02

 Australian CD single
 "I'm Outta Love" (radio edit) – 3:57
 "I'm Outta Love" (Hex Hector radio edit) – 3:51
 "I'm Outta Love" (Matty's 2 Deep Mix) – 9:29
 "I'm Outta Love" (Hex Hector main club mix) – 7:59
 "I'm Outta Love" (Ron Trent's club mix) – 8:35
 "Baptize My Soul" – 4:13

Credits and personnel
Credits are adapted from the Not That Kind booklet.

Studios
 Recorded and mixed at Homesite 13 (Novato, California)
 Mastered at Gateway Mastering (Portland, Maine, US)

Personnel
 Anastacia – writing, background vocals
 Sam Watters – writing, background vocals, drums, production
 Louis Biancaniello – writing, keyboards, drums, programming, production, mixing
 Vernon Black – guitars
 David Frazer – mixing
 Bob Ludwig – mastering

Charts

Weekly charts

Year-end charts

Decade-end charts

Certifications

Release history

References

2000 debut singles
2000 songs
Anastacia songs
Daylight Records singles
Epic Records singles
European Hot 100 Singles number-one singles
Music videos directed by Nigel Dick
Number-one singles in Australia
Number-one singles in New Zealand
Songs written by Anastacia
Songs written by Louis Biancaniello
Songs written by Sam Watters
Ultratop 50 Singles (Wallonia) number-one singles